The women's long jump event at the 2003 IAAF World Indoor Championships was held on March 16.

Results

References
Results

Long
Long jump at the World Athletics Indoor Championships
2003 in women's athletics